Love Story is an American dramatic anthology television series focused on stories of romance. It aired from October 3, 1973, to January 2, 1974, on NBC.

Love Story was the second American television series of the name, the first having been the DuMont Television Networks anthology series Love Story, which aired in 1954.

Synopsis

Each episode of Love Story told a story of romance and was an independent drama, unrelated to any other episode. The episodes were set in various locations around the United States, and told a wide variety of stories, each about problems faced by a heterosexual couple in love.

Cast

As an anthology series, Love Story had no regular cast. Each episode had a different cast as noted in the episodes list below.

Production

In 1970, the novel Love Story; the movie based on the novel, also called Love Story; and the movie's theme song, "Where Do I Begin," all were major hits. Hoping to capitalize on this success, NBC aired the television series Love Story three years later. Although the show shared its name with the novel and movie and used "Where Do I Begin" as its theme song, it otherwise was completely unrelated to the novel and movie, each of its episodes being an entirely original story with an entirely different cast. Generally, less well-known actors and actresses appeared in the show. Episode directors included Michael Landon and Donald Wrye. Writers included Landon and Elinor Karpf.

Broadcast history

Love Story premiered on NBC on October 3, 1973. It faced tough competition in its time slot from CBSs Kojak, and sharing its title and theme song with the movie Love Story did not help it to garner much of an audience, given that it had no characters or storylines in common with either the novel or the movie. With low ratings, it was cancelled after the broadcast of its 12th episode on January 2, 1974. The show aired at 10:00 p.m. on Wednesday throughout its run. It ranked 63rd out of 80 shows that season, with a 14.2 rating.

Episodes

References

External links
"(Where Do I Begin?) Love Story" – Theme from the television series Love Story (audio)

Love Story at CVTA with episode list

NBC original programming
1973 American television series debuts
1974 American television series endings
1970s American anthology television series
1970s American drama television series
English-language television shows
Television series by CBS Studios
Television shows set in Philadelphia